Valley Railroad No. 40 is a preserved 2-8-2 "Mikado" type steam locomotive that was built by Alco in 1920. It was initially built as No. 101 for the Portland, Astoria and Pacific Railroad as part of their small order of locomotives. However, the order was cancelled, and the locomotive was subsequently sold to the Minarets and Western Railway to pull logging trains. No. 101 subsequently went through several ownerships during revenue service, until it was retired in 1950, and by that time, it was renumbered to 40. After spending several years in storage, No. 40 made its way to the Connecticut Valley Railroad in Essex in 1977. As of 2022, No. 40 is being used to pull tourist trains between Essex and Hartford, Connecticut alongside 2-8-0 No. 97 and 2-8-2 No. 3025.

The 40 does currently have a surviving sister engine. Former Portland, Astoria & Pacific #102 went on to have a long working career in Canada on Vancouver Island. She was sold to the Alberni Pacific Railway in Port Alberni British Columbia and became their #6. She then operated for Macmillan Bloedel as their first 1055 until she was sold to Canadian Forest Products (Canfor) up in Northern Vancouver Island in Woss BC. She was first numbered 55, but then was renumbered to 113 which is the number she carries today. The 113 was retired in 1973, and was placed on static display. The company then brought her back to life in 1988 and used her for Canfor's company picnics. She was the pride of the line until she was retired again in 1995, and has ever since been placed on static display in Woss.

History

Original service life 
In August 1920, No. 40 became one of four 2-8-2 "Mikado" type locomotives that rolled out of the American Locomotive Company's Brooks Locomotive Works in Dunkirk, New York, and it was originally numbered 101. These four locomotives were initially constructed for the new Portland, Astoria and Pacific Railroad to be used to pull logging and lumber trains in Oregon. However, the railroad was quickly shut down before the locomotives were ever put into service, and they sat idle until 1921. That year, they were sold to the Minarets and Western Railway (M&W), a subsidiary of the Sugar Pine Lumber Company (SPLCO). The M&W put No. 101 into service by pulling lumber trains between the forest near Minarets and the railroad's sawmill at Pinedale. However, the SPLCO was struggling to pay their debts, and after the Great Depression had risen, the company declared bankruptcy in 1933.

As part of a foreclosure settlement, No. 101 was conveyed to the nearby Southern Pacific Railroad (SP). The SP couldn't make any usage out of light-weight 2-8-2s, so they soon sold No. 101 to the Birmingham Rail and Locomotive dealership. In January 1935, the locomotive was sold again to the Aberdeen and Rockfish Railroad (A&R) in North Carolina, who renumbered it to 40 and converted it from burning oil to burning coal. The A&R reassigned No. 40 to pull freight and passenger trains on their trackage between Aberdeen and Fayetteville, and it subsequently became a sentimental favorite of various crews that worked with it. On one occasion, however, the locomotive was involved in a major derailment that caused it to fall on its side. It was repaired and returned to service shortly afterward. During World War II, No. 40 was used as a supply of hot steam for trains that carried military soldiers out of the nearby Fort Bragg US army base.

After serving the A&R for seventeen years, No. 40 was retired from revenue service in 1952, and it was stored inside a small shed for the next several years. It became the only steam locomotive from the A&R to be spared from the scrapper's torch, since it was a sentimental favorite of various crews that worked with it, and the military trains out of Fort Bragg still needed a supply of heat. During special occasions, No. 40 would be towed out of the shed to various A&R communities to be displayed in local festivals. By the mid-1970s, the A&R began to consider donating No. 40 to the city of Aberdeen for permanent static display.

Surviving Sister Engine:

The 40 does currently have a surviving sister engine. Former Portland, Astoria & Pacific #102 went on to have a long working career in Canada on Vancouver Island. She was sold to the Alberni Pacific Railway in Port Alberni British Columbia and became their #6. She then operated for Macmillan Bloedel as their first 1055 until she was sold to Canadian Forest Products (Canfor) up in Northern Vancouver Island in Woss BC. She was first numbered 55, but then was renumbered to 113 which is the number she carries today. The 113 was retired in 1973, and was placed on static display. The company then brought her back to life in 1988 and used her for Canfor's company picnics. She was the pride of the line until she was retired again in 1995, and has ever since been placed on static display in Woss.

Connecticut Valley Railroad 

In 1977, the Connecticut Valley Railroad (CVRR), a tourist railroad that lies between Essex and Hartford over former New York, New Haven and Hartford trackage, was looking for a steam locomotive to serve as a running mate to their Ex-Birmingham and Southeastern 2-8-0 No. 97. After a CVRR employee discovered No. 40 and its disposition, the railroad made the A&R an offer they couldn't refuse, and the locomotive was pulled out of its shed and lifted onto two flatcars to be shipped to Connecticut. Upon arrival in Essex, No. 40 was test fired before it entered the CVRR's locomotive shops for an overhaul that lasted for less than two years. The locomotive entered service for the railroad in May 1979, and for the next several years, it remained as the CVRR's largest steam locomotive.

In September 1985, No. 40 was taken out of service after damaging a tire on one of its driving wheels. With No. 40 out of service, as well as No. 97 in need of an overhaul, the CVRR began searching for another steam locomotive for use in their operations, and they resulted in using China Railways SY 2-8-2 No. 1647 as their main flagship for two years. By the time No. 1647 was sold off, No. 40's running gear was repaired, and the locomotive was put back into service for the 1992 season. The locomotive was taken out of service again by the end of the 1990s after the Federal Railroad Administration (FRA) enforced that any active steam locomotive in the United States go through a mandated 1,472-day overhaul, No. 40 was returned to service in 2007.

In 2008, No. 40 lost its title as the CVRR's largest locomotive after the railroad purchased SY No. 58, which entered service for the CVRR in 2011 as New Haven No. 3025.

Film history 

 One shot of No. 40 is seen in a music video for Billy Joel's 1993 song River of Dreams.
 No. 40 is seen in multiple scenes in the 2021 Hallmark Christmas film Next Stop, Christmas, which stars Lyndsy Fonseca, Chandler Massey, and Christopher Lloyd, and it was directed by Dustin Rikert.

See also 

 Valley Railroad 3025
 Tremont and Gulf 30
 Duluth and Northern Minnesota 14
 McCloud Railway 18

References

External links 

 Essex Steam Train website

2-8-2 locomotives
Railway locomotives introduced in 1920
Standard gauge locomotives of the United States
Individual locomotives of the United States
Preserved steam locomotives of Connecticut
ALCO locomotives